The Canadian Establishment is a series of books published in Canada by economic journalist Peter C. Newman to catalogue the richest families and individuals in the country. The first book was published in 1975 and introduced Canadian and world readers to little-known figures who defined the Canadian economic community of the last quarter of the 20th century.

References

Canadian Establishment, The
Canadian Establishment, The
Canadian Establishment, The
Books by Peter C. Newman
McClelland & Stewart books
Business books